Stade Al-Merghani Kassala is a multi-use stadium in Kassala, in northeastern Sudan.  It is currently used mostly for football matches and is the home stadium of Al-Merrikh.  
The Stadium has a capacity of 11,000 people.

Al-Merghani Kassala